CHLP-FM, is a Canadian radio station which broadcasts a country music format on the frequency of 100.1 MHz FM in Listowel, Ontario. The station is branded as The Ranch.

History
On April 25, 2019, Five Amigos Broadcasting Inc. received an approval from the CRTC to operate a new FM radio station at Listowel on 100.1 MHz with 4,900 watts (maximum ERP of 8,000 watts with an effective height of the antenna above average terrain of 83 metres).

On September 15, 2020, the station officially launched as Perth County's Hottest Country - 100.1 The Ranch.

The callsign CHLP was used at a former radio station in Montreal from the 1930s to the 1950s. It is unknown if the callsign was used at another radio or television station until its current use in Listowel in 2020.

References

External links
theranch100.com
CHLP-FM History of - Canadian Communications Foundation

Hlp
Radio stations established in 2020
2020 establishments in Ontario